Sonia Yesenia Cruz Ayala (born ) is a Salvadoran beauty pageant titleholder who was crowned Nuestra Belleza El Salvador 2010 and represented her country in the 2010 Miss Universe pageant.

Early life
A resident of San Salvador, Cruz is pursuing a bachelor's degree in business management at Universidad Centroamericana "José Simeón Cañas" and will graduate in 2012.

Prior to her participation in Nuestra Belleza El Salvador, Cruz was elected queen of Fiestas Agustinas, a traditional Salvadoran festivity  in memory of the Transfiguration of Jesus.

Nuestra Belleza El Salvador 2010

Miss Universe 2010
As the official representative of her country to the 2010 Miss Universe pageant broadcast live from Paradise, Nevada on August 23, Cruz participated as one of 83 delegates who vied for the crown of eventual winner, Ximena Navarrete of Mexico.

Miss Continente Americano 2010
After Miss Universe 2010, Cruz represented El Salvador in Miss Continente Americano 2010, held on September 18, 2010, in Guayaquil, Ecuador.

References

External links
Official Nuestra Belleza El Salvador website

1990s births
Living people
Miss Universe 2010 contestants
People from San Salvador
Salvadoran beauty pageant winners
Miss El Salvador winners
Central American University alumni